The 1978 TAA Formula Ford Driver to Europe Series was an Australian motor racing competition for Formula Ford racing cars. It was the ninth national series for Formula Fords to be held in Australia.

The series was won by John Wright driving a Bowin P4.

Schedule
The series was contested over eight rounds.

Series standings

Notes & references

External links
 Image of the Bowin P4 with which John Wright won the series, primotipo.com, as archived at  web.archive.org

TAA Formula Ford Driver to Europe Series
Australian Formula Ford Series